Pedal on Parliament is a grassroots campaign group that wants Scotland to be a place where active travel is safe and enjoyable. Set up in 2012, it seeks improvements to make conditions on Scotland's roads suitable for those aged from 8 to 80. Events were initially held annually, which for the first seven years centred around people cycling through Edinburgh to the Parliament. A simultaneous ride in Aberdeen was introduced in 2015. In 2017 rides where also held in Glasgow and Inverness as well as in Edinburgh and Aberdeen. In 2018, events took place over two days in Edinburgh, Inverness and Aberdeen. In 2019, there was a switch to local events being organised, with 20 events planned between the Friday and Sunday. In 2020 and 2021 because of the Coronavirus epidemic group rides were not held, with people instead encouraged to undertake actions as individuals to mark the date of Pedal on Parliament. In 2022 a ride is organised for Saturday 23 April.

Manifesto 
The campaign has an eight-point manifesto of areas for improvement towards making Scotland a cycle-friendly nation:

 Proper funding for cycling
 Design cycling into Scotland’s roads
 Safer speeds where people live, work and play
 Integrate cycling into local transport strategies
 Sensible road traffic law and enforcement
 Reduce the risk of HGVs to cyclists and pedestrians
 A strategic and joined-up programme of road user training
 Solid research on cycling to support policy-making

Pedal on Parliament ride 

Each year, a ride has followed a route from The Meadows to the Scottish Parliament. The main ride gathers at Middle Meadow Walk, and then travels via George IV Bridge and the Royal Mile. The ride down to the parliament is carried out at a leisurely pace as there are many children, some on balance bikes, and also people walking alongside that are not able to cycle for whatever reason. It is policed mainly by Edinburgh-based Police on bikes, who also ride in with some of the local feeder rides. This can exceed 200 cyclists, and takes around 30 minutes for the end of the ride to leave the Meadows. During the ride, road in the area are closed to traffic.

Participants in the main ride assemble at the parliament where speeches are then given by activists, politicians and others.

A minute's silence has been held at these rides, to remember those unfortunate cyclists who have been killed on the roads. In contrast, ringing of bike bells has also been used to celebrate cycling, and to signal agreement with speakers.

Feeder rides 

A series of "feeder rides" are organised from various locations around Edinburgh and Scotland. These allow people to cycle to the event in a group, with the benefit of safety in numbers as well as being a sociable occasion. The feeder rides are often joined by people en route to the Meadows, either at pre-defined points, or ad-hoc. There was also a guided ride back to the Meadows along quiet streets after the event was over.

History 
Pedal on Parliament is a grassroots campaign which first organised a protest ride in 2012 in response to the death of Andrew McNicoll and the lack of investment in cycling. Before the group was formed, there was no national cycling campaign for Scotland. After the large turnout in 2012, the group realised that their work would need to continue. The group are now one of the organisations that take part in Scottish Parliament's Cross-Party group on cycling.

Inaugural 2012 event
The first event took place on Saturday 28 April 2012, with between 2500-3000 people in attendance. After gathering at the Meadows, a two minute science was held, before the ride was lead off by Mark Beaumont and people cycled down to the parliament where they delivered a petition that had been signed by over 3000 people. This rally had followed several meetings between Government and road safety professionals and safety campaigners.

2013 event
The second event was held on Sunday 19 May 2013. The procession of 4000 cyclists were led by the families of Audrey Fyfe and Andrew McNicoll who were both killed while cycling in Edinburgh, as well as the athlete Graeme Obree. Paul Wheelhouse, Minister for Environment and Climate Change, received the campaign's eight-point manifesto.

2014 event 
The third Pedal on Parliament was held on 26 April 2014, and was the largest yet, with estimates of over 4500 people attending. The event had started at midday due to allow for the football match traffic later that day and the Great Edinburgh Run being held the following day.

Speeches were introduced by David Brennan, one of the organisers, and began with the views from three children, who were followed by a number of MSPs and campaign leaders:
 Daniel, Kyle, and Katharine: children who explained they wanted to cycle, but couldn't because of the lack of safe infrastructure and the dangerous roads between their house and school
 Keith Brown MSP, Minister for Transport (SNP), who remarked that "this was the largest demonstration we have seen outside parliament"
 Alison Johnstone MSP, Lothian (Green)
 Willie Rennie MSP, Mid Scotland and Fife (Lib Dem)
 Claudia Beamish MSP, South Scotland (Labour)
 Councillor Cameron Rose, Edinburgh (Conservative)
 Lynne McNicoll from the charity Andrew Cyclist
 Chris Oliver from Road Share spoke about the campaign for presumed liability

Several other MSPs and councillors were at the event, primarily from Edinburgh and the surrounding areas.

2015 event 
The fourth event was held on Saturday 25 April 2015. Transport Minister Derek Mackay attended the event along with representatives of all the main political parties.

Speeches were again held outside the Parliament, following a minute's silence for those who have been killed on the roads.
 Briana Pegado, President of the Edinburgh University Students' Association
 Emilia Hanna, Friends of the Earth
 Derek Mackay MSP, Minister for Transport and Islands, announced "record breaking" funding for cycling in 2015/16
 Cameron Buchanan MSP, Conservative
 Sarah Boyack MSP, Labour
 Alison Johnstone MSP, Green
 Bruce Whitehead, Left Unity candidate

Pedal on Marischal, Aberdeen 

A simultaneous ride was also held in Aberdeen, from Hazlehead Park to Marischal College, to increase the profile of cycling in the city. Around 150 people gathered at the headquarters of Aberdeen City Council and were met by councilors from a range of parties.

2016 event 
A fifth mass ride event was held on 23 April 2016, during the run up to the Scottish elections, with a main ride in Edinburgh and a simultaneous ride in Aberdeen. The Edinburgh ride was attended by the leaders of three political parties- Kezia Dugdale, Willie Rennie and Patrick Harvie. It was the second year that Derek Mackay, Scotland's Minister for Transport, took part.

2017 events 
In 2017, local elections were being held and organisers planned to have rides over two days, initially announcing rides in Edinburgh, Aberdeen and Glasgow. A ride in Inverness was announced later.

In Aberdeen there were around 100 people on the ride, while there were around 120 people on the Inverness ride.

2018 events 
In 2018, the main ride in Edinburgh took place leaving from the Meadows at midday on 28 April. A ride was held in Inverness the same day. On the following day, a ride in Aberdeen went from Hazlehead Park to Union Street. A decision was made by organizers not to hold a ride in Glasgow in 2018.

2019 events 
In 2019 there was no main ride to the Scottish Parliament, with a switch to local events being organised and 20 events were planned between the Friday and Sunday. For the first time there was an event in Dundee. In Glasgow there was an event calling for a safe pedestrian crossing area at Victoria Park. An event at Bearsden was intended to raise pressure towards completion of the "Bears Way" cycle route.

2021 events 
In 2021 the theme was Light up Scotland with cyclists being encouraged to undertake actions in the evening and light there bikes up in particular highlighting the message - 'This machine fights Climate Change'. For the 2021 United Nations Climate Change Conference (COP26), a mass ride was part of the COP Global Day of Action March in Glasgow on 6 November with the theme being Pedal on COP.

2022 events 
In 2022 a ride is organised for Saturday 23 April. On this occasion the route begins at Chambers Street.

References

External links 
 

Cycling safety
Cycling in Scotland